KGRW (94.7 FM) is a radio station  broadcasting a Country music format. Licensed to Friona, Texas, United States, the station serves the Clovis, New Mexico area.  The station is currently owned by HPRN Networks, LLP

History
The station went on the air as KGRW on April 22, 1993. On May 17, 1993, the station changed its call sign to the current KGRW.

References

External links
La Caliente 94.7 & 98.3 Facebook

GRW
Parmer County, Texas